Vinicius Moreira Castro (born February 28, 1989) is a Brazilian mixed martial artist currently competing in the Light heavyweight division. He is most known for his time spent fighting in the Ultimate Fighting Championship (UFC).

Background
Inspired by Minotauro Nogueira's fights in Pride FC, Moreira started training jiu-jitsu in 2006 as his first martial art. After growing unmotivated by jiu-jitsu, he started training mixed martial arts in 2015, making his professional debut in the following year.

Mixed martial arts career

Early career
Moreira began his MMA career by compiling an MMA record of 8–1 by competing mainly within the Brazilian regional MMA circuit as well as in India for Super Fight League.

Dana White's Contender Series Brazil
Moreira faced John Allan on August 11, 2018, at Dana White's Contender Series Brazil 3. He won the fight via submission with a triangle choke and was awarded with a UFC contract.

Ultimate Fighting Championship
Moreira made his UFC debut against Alonzo Menifield on January 19, 2019, at UFC Fight Night: Cejudo vs. Dillashaw. He lost the fight via technical knockout due to punches in the first round.

Moreira then faced Eryk Anders on June 29, 2019, at UFC on ESPN: Ngannou vs. dos Santos. He lost the fight via knockout due to punches in the first round.

Moreira next faced Paul Craig on September 21, 2019, at UFC Fight Night: Rodríguez vs. Stephens. He lost the fight via submission with a rear-naked choke in the first round.

Moreira was scheduled to face Tyson Pedro on February 23, 2020, at UFC Fight Night: Felder vs. Hooker. However, Pedro withdrew from the bout in early January due to an undisclosed injury.

Moreira was expected to face Modestas Bukauskas on July 15, 2020, at UFC Fight Night 172. However, on July 3, Moreira tested positive for COVID-19 and was removed from the event.

On January 15, Moreira received a public warning by USADA due to an out-of-competition positive test for anastrozole in September 2020. He had provided a supplement that was proven to be tainted with the substance.

Moreira was scheduled to face Ike Villanueva on January 30, 2021, at UFC Fight Night 186. In late December 2020, the UFC opted against holding an event on a planned January 30 date and decided to reschedule several bouts to January 20, 2021, at UFC on ESPN: Magny vs. Chiesa. He lost the fight by knockout in the second round.

On February 4, 2021, it was announced that Moreira was released from his UFC contract.

Post UFC 
Moreira made his first appearance after his UFC release against Rodrigo Duarte on August 8, 2021, at Brazilian Fighting Series 1. He won the bout after the bout was stopped by the doctor after the first round.

Moreira faced Aleksandr Maslov at Open Fight Championship 9 on August 27, 2021, for the OFC Heavyweight Championship. He lost the bout via unanimous decision.

Moreira faced Mikhail Mokhnatkin on December 19, 2021, at Open Fighting Championship 15. He lost via unanimous decision.

Moreira returned against Sergey Dyakonov at MMA Series 53 on June 24, 2022. He lost the bout via unanimous decision.

Championships and accomplishments

Fam Fight MMA
 FFMMA Heavyweight Championship (One time)

Mixed martial arts record

|-
|Loss
|align=center|10–8
|Sergey Dyakonov
|Decision (unanimous)
|MMA Series 53
|
| align=center|3
| align=center|5:00
|Moscow, Russia
|
|-
|Loss
|align=center|10–7
|Mikhail Mokhnatkin
|Decision (unanimous)
|Open Fighting Championship 15
|
| align=center|3
| align=center|5:00
|Moscow, Russia
|
|-
|Loss
|align=center|10–6
|Aleksandr Maslov
| Decision (unanimous)
| Open Fighting Championship 9
| 
| align=center|3
| align=center|5:00
| Ekaterinburg, Russia
|
|-
|Win
|align=center|10–5
|Rodrigo Duarte
| TKO (doctor stoppage)
| Brazilian Fighting Series 1
| 
| align=center|1
| align=center|5:00
| Rio de Janeiro, Brazil
|
|-
|Loss
|align=center|9–5
|Ike Villanueva
| KO (punch)
| UFC on ESPN: Magny vs. Chiesa
| 
| align=center|2
| align=center|0:39
| Abu Dhabi, United Arab Emirates
|
|-
|Loss
|align=center|9–4
|Paul Craig
|Submission (rear-naked choke)
|UFC Fight Night: Rodríguez vs. Stephens
|
|align=center|1
|align=center|3:19
|Mexico City, Mexico
|
|-
|Loss
|align=center|9–3
|Eryk Anders
|KO (punches)
|UFC on ESPN: Ngannou vs. dos Santos
|
|align=center|1
|align=center|1:18
|Minneapolis, Minnesota, United States
|
|-
|Loss
|align=center|9–2
|Alonzo Menifield
|TKO (punches)
|UFC Fight Night: Cejudo vs. Dillashaw
|
|align=center|1
|align=center|3:56
|Brooklyn, New York, United States
|
|-
|Win
|align=center|9–1
|John Allan
|Submission (triangle choke)
|Dana White's Contender Series Brazil 3
|
|align=center|2
|align=center|3:40
|Las Vegas, Nevada, United States
|
|-
|Win
|align=center|8–1
|Jason Radcliffe
|Submission (arm-triangle choke)
|SFL 2018 Semifinals: Haryana Sultans vs. U.P. Nawabs
|
|align=center|1
|align=center|4:07
|Mumbai, India
|
|-
|Win
|align=center|7–1
|Sachin Kumar
|Submission (armbar)
|SFL 2018: Sher-E-Punjab vs. Haryana Sultans
|
|align=center|1
|align=center|1:24
|Mumbai, India
|
|-
|Win
|align=center|6–1
|Amit Thapa
|Submission (rear-naked choke)
|SFL 2018: Haryana Sultans vs. Mumbai Maniacs
|
|align=center|1
|align=center|1:05
|Mumbai, India
|
|-
|Win
|align=center|5–1
|José Aparecido Santos Gomes
|Submission (arm-triangle choke)
|SFL 2018: Haryana Sultans vs. Bengaluru Tigers
|
|align=center|2
|align=center|N/A
|Mumbai, India
|
|-
|Loss
|align=center|4–1
|Rafael Celestino
|KO (punches)
|Shooto Brazil 77
|
|align=center|1
|align=center|2:27
|Brasília, Brazil
|
|-
|Win
|align=center|4–0
|Renan Ferreira
|Submission (armbar)
|Fam Fight Night
|
|align=center|1
|align=center|3:37
|Goiânia, Brazil
|
|-
|Win
|align=center|3–0
|Vinicius Lima
|Submission (keylock)
|The Warriors Combat 3
|
|align=center|2
|align=center|4:39
|Brasília, Brazil
|
|-
|Win
|align=center|2–0
|Gustavo Moralis
|TKO (punches)
|Magal Fight 1
|
|align=center|1
|align=center|1:54
|Alexânia, Brazil
|
|-
|Win
|align=center|1–0
|Gabriel Scheufler
|Submission (rear-naked choke)
|Fight K Águia
|
|align=center|1
|align=center|2:57
|Gama, Brazil
|
|-

See also 
 List of male mixed martial artists

References

External links 
 
 

1989 births
Living people
Light heavyweight mixed martial artists
Mixed martial artists utilizing Brazilian jiu-jitsu
Brazilian male mixed martial artists
Brazilian practitioners of Brazilian jiu-jitsu
People awarded a black belt in Brazilian jiu-jitsu
Sportspeople from Federal District (Brazil)
Ultimate Fighting Championship male fighters